The 2004 Kansas City Wizards season was the ninth for the club in Major League Soccer. Kansas City completed what was their best-performing season at the time: the Wizards finished first in the Western Conference and second overall with 49 points. The club scored 38 goals and conceded 30 goals, the latter being the fewest in the 10-team season. The Wizards would eliminate defending MLS Cup champion San Jose Earthquakes over two legs in the conference semifinals, then defeat the 2002 MLS Cup winner LA Galaxy in the one-legged Western Conference final to advance to MLS Cup 2004.

In MLS Cup, Kansas City faced D.C. United, the second-place team in the East who had navigated significant mainstream media attention throughout the season due to the signing of teenage sensation Freddy Adu. The Wizards opened scoring in MLS Cup through José Burciaga Jr. in minute 6, but were done in by three successive D.C. goals (including an Alex Zotincă own goal) as United took home the Cup in a 3–2 result.

Despite this ending to the season, the Wizards did attain silverware in the 2004 calendar year. In September, the club won their first U.S. Open Cup. Kansas City beat rivals Chicago Fire 1–0 in the final, which served as a bulwark somewhat from the tough MLS Cup loss. Their seasonal performance also qualified them for the ensuing CONCACAF Champions' Cup.

Squad

Competitions

Major League Soccer

U.S. Open Cup

MLS Cup Playoffs

Squad statistics

Final Statistics

References

Sporting Kansas City seasons
Kansas City Wizards
Kansas City Wizards
2004